Arrow Line may refer to:
 Arrow (rail line), in Southern California
 A defunct joint venture of the former shipping business Sudden & Christenson Company